This is a list of members of the Western Australian Legislative Council from 22 May 1968 to 21 May 1971. The chamber had 30 seats made up of 15 provinces each electing two members, on a system of rotation whereby one-half of the members would retire at each triennial election.

Notes
 On 31 December 1970, North Province Labor MLC Harry Strickland resigned. Labor candidate John Hunt won the resulting by-election on 20 February 1971.
 Three retiring MLCs died in the period leading to the 1971 election, and their positions were not filled. These were Labor members Frederick Lavery (12 January 1971) and Jim Garrigan (5 April 1971), and Country Party member Edward House (1 January 1971).

Sources
 
 
 

Members of Western Australian parliaments by term